Płutnica is a river of Poland.  It leads to the Bay of Puck above the town of Puck.

Rivers of Poland
Rivers of Pomeranian Voivodeship
1Płutnica